Teachers from the technological and computer universities and some others medical universities launched a blue ribbon campaign to protest what they called the unfair promotion policy of the Ministry of Education.

The campaign was officially launched on July 31, 2017 and the pre-movement started on July 25 in some universities.

References 

Education in Myanmar
Awareness ribbon